The 13th Central American and Caribbean Games were held in Medellín, Colombia from July 7 to July 28, 1978, and included 2,605 athletes from nineteen nations, competing in 21 sports.

Sports

References
 Meta
 

 
Central American and Caribbean Games, 1978
Central American and Caribbean Games
Central American and Caribbean Games, 1978
Central
1978 in Caribbean sport
1978 in Central American sport
Multi-sport events in Colombia
Sport in Medellín
July 1978 sports events in South America